Klinkenberg is a town in the Dutch province of South Holland. It is located in the municipality of Teylingen, about 2 km southwest of Sassenheim.

References

Populated places in South Holland